Jannik Tepe (born 11 March 1999) is a German footballer who plays as a forward for 1. FC Monheim.

References

External links
 Profile at FuPa.net

1999 births
Living people
German footballers
Association football forwards
VfL Osnabrück players
Fortuna Düsseldorf II players
3. Liga players